Porsova may refer to:
Porsova, Jalilabad, Azerbaijan
Porsova, Yardymli, Azerbaijan